Whitehorn "Whitey" Kirst is an American-Canadian rock guitarist, singer and songwriter, primarily known for his long collaboration with Iggy Pop as lead guitarist from 1990 to 2003, and co-composer from 1996 to 2003.

Since 2007, he has formed his own band "The Web of Spider", a straight-ahead rock and roll power trio featuring notably (and chronologically) Phil "Philthy Animal" Taylor, Max Noce, Chris Wyse, Mike Starr, Stefan Adika and Tommy Clufetos.

Discography

Solo 
 Eat me (2008)
 Vol.11 (2009)
 All Rise! (2012)

With Iggy Pop 
 Naughty Little Doggie (1996)
 Avenue B (1999)
 Beat 'Em Up (2001)
 Skull Ring (2003)

Collaborations 
 Brick by Brick (1990)
 Freddy's Dead: The Final Nightmare (1991)
 Sunday Nights: The Songs of Junior Kimbrough (2005)
 Licker's Last Leg (Ipecac Recordings) (2007)
 Along Came a Spider (2008)
 The High End of Low (2008)

Videography 
 Iggy Pop. Kiss My blood. Live at the Olympia 1991/A film by Tim Pope (DVD) (2004)
 Iggy Pop. Live at the avenue B/Serge Bergli (DVD) (2005)

References

Canadian rock guitarists
Canadian male guitarists
Living people
Year of birth missing (living people)